Hossein Dehlavi (September 30, 1927 – October 15, 2019) was an Iranian composer.

Biography 
Hossein Dehlavi was born in 1927 in Tehran, Iran and started music with his father Moezeddin Emami who was a pupil of master Ali-Akbar Shahnazi. Dehlavi studied composition at the Tehran Conservatory of Music with Hossein Nassehi and Heimo Tauber. He studied Persian music with Abolhasan Saba and, from 1957 to 1967, was the principal conductor of the Persian Fine Arts Administration Orchestra, also known as Saba Orchestra.

Dehlavi started to teach at the Persian National Music Conservatory in Tehran since 1957 and from 1961 until 1950 was the director of this conservatory. The conductor Ali Rahbari was one of his pupils. In 1992, with the cooperation of nearly 70 players of Persian instruments, Dehlavi established the Plectrum Orchestra in Tehran. 

His works included several pieces for Persian instruments and orchestra, voice and orchestra, choir and orchestra, and two operas and a ballet. As his contribution to the Year of the Child (1979), he wrote an opera for children called Mana and Mani.

His wife Susan Aslani and his son Houman Dehlavi are also famous musicians.

Selected Compositions
Chamber Works
 Duo for Santur, 1953
 Plectrum Quartet (Chahar-Navazi-e Mezrabi), 1964

Orchestral Works
 Sabolkbal (Breezy), 1953
 Shushtari, for violin and orchestra, based on a piece by Abolhassan Saba, 1958.
 Concertino for Santur & Orchestra (with Faramarz Payvar), 1958
 Forugh-e Eshgh (Blaze of Love) - 1963
 Sarbaz (Soldier) with choir, 1966.

Opera
 Khosrow and Shirin (based on a romance by the 12th-century Persian poet Nizami Ganjavi, 1970.
 Mana and Mani (for children), 1979.

Ballet
 Bijan & Manijeh ballet (inspired from the National epic of Persia Shahnameh by Ferdowsi) - premiered at Tehran's Rudaki Hall in 1975

Death 
On October 15, 2019, Dehlavi died at his home in Tehran. He had been suffering from Alzheimer’s disease for years.

See also 

 Music of Iran
 List of Iranian musicians

References

External links 
 Classical Music Daily: Hossein Dehlavi profile
 Hossein Dehlavi Official Website 
 Hossein Dehlav: Worldcat

1927 births
2019 deaths
Iranian classical composers
Musicians from Tehran
Male classical composers
20th-century classical composers
20th-century male musicians
21st-century classical composers
21st-century male musicians
Iranian Science and Culture Hall of Fame recipients in Music
Iran's Book of the Year Awards recipients